Brumby is a surname. Notable people with the surname include:

Beatrice Brumby (1914–2012), Australian pioneer
Colin Brumby (1933–2018), Australian composer and conductor
Frank H. Brumby (1874–1950), American admiral
Glen Brumby (born 1960), Australian squash player
Ian Brumby (born 1964), English snooker player
John Brumby (born 1953), Australian politician, premier of Victoria 2007–10
Monique Brumby (born 1974), Australian musician
Sandy Brumby (born ), Aboriginal Australian artist